Gadin is a surname. Notable people with the surname include:

 Daniel Pérez Gadín (21st century), Argentinian accountant
 Philip Palet Gadin (21st century), South Sudanese politician

See also
 Kadin (name)
 Radin